Beseda (Macedonian Cyrillic: Беседа) was a periodical magazine in former Yugoslavia for Art and Culture.

References

Mass media in Kumanovo
Macedonian-language magazines